The Pagal Panthis (lit. 'followers of the mad path') were a socio-religious order that emerged in the late 18th-century in the Mymensingh region of Bengal (now located in Bangladesh). Adherents of a syncretic mixture of Hinduism, Sufism and Animism, the order sought to uphold religious principles and the rights of landless peasants in Bengal; under the leadership of Tipu Shah, the movement soon evolved into a popular, armed struggle against the British East India Company and the zamindar (landlord) system. It was crushed with the help of the army in 1833. It was a semi religious sect having influence in the northern districts of Bengal. Pagal panthi movement was of Hodi, Garo and Hajong tribes. It was led by Hodi leader Janku Pathar and Debraj Pathar.

History
The Pagal Panthis was a religious movement that emerged in the northern Mymensingh and Sherpur District area of the province of Bengal. In contrast to the rest of Bengal, the region was inhabited mainly by tribal peoples such as the Garos, Hajangs, Dalus, Hodis and Rajvangshies, who were mainly adherents of Animism and tribal faiths. The region enjoyed considerable religious harmony and served as a base for religious reform movements such as the Pagal Panthis, an order founded by Karim Shah and other disciples of the Muslim fakir Majnu Shah, the leader of the Madariya Sufi order. After the death of Karim Shah in 1813, the order was led by his son Tipu Shah. Chandi Bibi, the wife of Karim Shah and Tipu Shah's mother also held an influential position in the community, known as Pir-Mata (Saint-Mother).

Philosophy
The philosophy and teachings of Karim Shah were a syncretism of Sufism, Hindu philosophy and local customs, traditions and beliefs. The religious order gained popularity amongst the native peoples and brought together a diverse collection of tribes, Muslims, Hindus and Animists. The order preached monotheism, human equality, non-violence and encouraged the people to overcome social and religious differences and avoid conflicts and dogma. Karim Shah and his followers addressed each other as "Bhaisaheb" (brother) to promote equality and brotherhood. Karim Shah himself was popularly believed to possess spiritual powers enabling him to foretell events, cure diseases and heal people.

The movement was shunned and criticised by Bengali Muslim society and its leaders, who condemned religious syncretism and referred to the order as Pagal Panthis – literally the followers of a "mad faith." However, the order gained widespread popularity amongst peasant masses. Under Tipu Shah, the order extended the philosophy to demand equal socio-economic rights for the peasants of the region. Tipu Shah proclaimed that no unilateral ownership of land could be allowed, as God had created humans as equals, thus granting every human an equal right to the lands. Those who forced peasants to pay taxes and oppressed them lost the moral right to rule over others. Ruling in the name of Allah, Tipu Shah enforced religious laws and encouraged tax resistance.

Peasant rebellions
The patron-saint of the Pagal Panthis, Majnu Shah, had been famous for encouraging revolts against the British East India Company, which had gained control over Bengal and later much of India. Under Tipu Shah, the order focused on organising peasants in rebellions against oppressive taxes and laws imposed by the zamindars (landlords) and the British.

The region had been devastated by war between British forces and Burma. To meet the costs of war, severe taxation was imposed on the region's peasants by the Company and the landlords. Forcible collections and usurpation of property increased peasant discontent and disorder. The Pagal Panthis sought to protect and defend peasants from the militias of the landlords and the Company's armed forces. Basing his forces in a mud-fort near Sherpur, Tipu Shah proclaimed his rule in the name of Allah and assumed the religious and political leadership of the community. The people of the region stopped paying taxes to the British and followed Tipu Shah's rulings. Although Tipu Shah and his aides were arrested in 1833 and tried, the government subsequently met many of the peasant demands, including lowering the rent rate and other taxes. Compromises and agreements between the landlords, the Company and the peasants helped restore peace and order in the northern Mymensingh region.

After Tipu Shah's death in 1852, the order came under the leadership of Janku and Dobraj Pathor, who organised another peasant resistance movement against the landlords and British authorities. An armed group of Pagal Panthis under the leadership of the Pathors stormed into Sherpur town, looted government offices and overpowered the officials, landlords and police, forcing them to flee to Mymensingh. Declaring themselves rulers of the town and surrounding areas, the rebels held control for almost two years. Negotiations and compromises between the rebels and the British helped forge peace and further concessions to the cause of the peasants.

References

Hinduism in Bangladesh
Sufism in Bangladesh
Bengal Presidency
Indian independence movement
Tax resistance
Peasant revolts
Syncretic political movements
18th century in British India
19th century in British India
Revolutionary movement for Indian independence
Rebellions against the British Empire